Mapire is a town situated in the Bideau Parish of the Valdez Municipality, Sucre, Venezuela. The town is situated 24 kilometers from Guiria, the capital of Valdez, on the Paria Peninsula.

Quick facts

Population: 120 inhabitants
Demonym: Maripero
Currency: Bolívar fuerte (VEF)
Economy : Fishing and Tourism
Time zone: (GMT -4)
Calling code: 0294
zip code: 6150
Coordinates:10° 38' 26" North, 62° 8' 58" West
Official language: Spanish
Mayor: Jesus Ramirez Lopez
Patron Saint: Coronation of Virgen del Valle - May 31

Geography

 Mapire Beach
This beautiful cove is a settlement of several fishermen families, and has a small river that supplies the population with water. This bay is open towards the south; the beach is 100 meters long.

Ubication: In the south coast of the Paria Peninsula, 4 kilometers to the west of Puerto de Hierro.

 original name: Mapire
 geographical location: Valdez, Sucre, Venezuela, South America
 geographical coordinates: 10° 38' 26" North, 62° 8' 58" West

History
The story told by José Stronghold Logan (historian, singer, poet and farmer), says that were families Garcia, Gonzalez. Villava and Blanc, the first inhabitants of the town, dedicated to working the land, specifically the cultivation of cocoa.

How to get there
Mapire is reached from Guiria by sea route an hour (by boat or otherwise) or via land road vehicles suitable for large and small, to Salina, Campo santo, Juan Pedro and other coastal hamlets

Tourism
Mapire has a stunning beach, in harmony with mountain ranges, slopes encarpadas itself wrapped by a mountain climate. In Mapire its inhabitants are divided into two sectors. La Playa (beach) and El Cerro (the hill). in the beach fishing of (snapper, mullet, Moor, etc.) is performed, woodworking (making fishing boats) and dry cocoa produced in the estates. In the Hill have settled most of the families find the school, the chapel of the town and the river Mapire, water source and meeting area for residents.

Gallery

External links

 Mapire Tourism Foundation official website 
 Miss Paria Beauty Pageant  
 Aerea de Mapire

Sucre